NASM–SR or Naval Anti-Ship Missile–Short Range is a helicopter launched anti-ship missile being developed by the Defence Research and Development Organisation for the Indian Navy. It is the second indigenous air launched anti-ship cruise missile developed for the Indian Navy.

Development
Since 1980s, the Indian Navy has been using Sea Eagle anti-ship missile on its Westland Sea King Mk42B multipurpose helicopter. The NASM-SR is intended as a replacement for the Sea Eagle missile which restricted flight range and increased take-off weight. The development of NASM-SR was made public for the first time in 2018 by the then Minister of Defence Nirmala Sitharaman. Fund of ₹434.06 crore for the development was also allocated in the same year. The design and specifications of the new missile was revealed at the DefExpo 2020. The specification showed Mach 0.8 capable air launched anti-ship missile with a range of 55 km. The missile has an Imaging Infra-Red (IIR) seeker immune to jamming, state-of-the-art navigation system and integrated avionics.

The NASM-SR can be easily adapted to launch from ships and land-based vehicles. DRDO is speculated to be developing a long range version of it for attacking land targets. As the Sea King Helicopters are being phased out, the NASM-SR will be equipped on Indian Navy's newly acquired MH-60R naval helicopters.

Testing

Indian Navy successfully carried out the first test of the missile from a Sea King Mk42B helicopter on 18 May 2022. On maiden test firing, NASM-SR demonstrated its sea skimming capability and approaches the target at 5m above the sea level. The maiden test was successful, and the missile is said to have reached the designated target with high degree of accuracy. It validated the control, guidance and mission algorithms.

See also

 Sea Killer / Marte
 Sea Venom (missile)
 Sea Eagle (missile)

References

External links
General:
 Technology Focus : Ammunition Systems and Warhead Technologies, Defence Research and Development Organisation

Missiles
Anti-ship missiles of India